The 2012 College Football All-America Team includes those players of American college football who have been honored by various selector organizations as the best players at their respective positions.  The selector organizations award the "All-America" honor annually following the conclusion of the fall college football season.  The original All-America team was the 1889 College Football All-America Team selected by Caspar Whitney and Walter Camp.  In 1950, the National Collegiate Athletic Bureau, which is the National Collegiate Athletic Association's (NCAA) service bureau, compiled the first list of All-Americans including first-team selections on teams created for a national audience that received national circulation with the intent of recognizing selections made from viewpoints that were nationwide.  Since 1952, College Sports Information Directors of America (CoSIDA) has bestowed Academic All-American recognition on male and female athletes in Divisions I, II, and III of the NCAA as well as National Association of Intercollegiate Athletics athletes, covering all NCAA championship sports.

The 2012 College Football All-America Team is composed of the following College Football All-American first teams chosen by the following selector organizations: Associated Press (AP), Football Writers Association of America (FWAA), American Football Coaches Association (AFCA), Walter Camp Foundation (WCFF), The Sporting News (TSN), Sports Illustrated (SI), Pro Football Weekly (PFW), ESPN, CBS Sports (CBS), College Football News (CFN), Scout.com, and Yahoo! Sports (Yahoo!).

Currently, the NCAA compiles consensus all-America teams in the sports of Division I-FBS football and Division I men's basketball using a point system computed from All-America teams named by coaches associations or media sources.  The system consists of three points for a first-team honor, two points for second-team honor, and one point for third-team honor.  Honorable mention and fourth team or lower recognitions are not accorded any points.  Football consensus teams are compiled by position and the player accumulating the most points at each position is named first team consensus all-American.  Currently, the NCAA recognizes All-Americans selected by the AP, AFCA, FWAA, TSN, and the WCFF to determine Consensus All-Americans.

In 2012, there were 13 unanimous All-Americans.

Offense

Quarterback
Tajh Boyd, Clemson (AFCA)
Johnny Manziel, Texas A&M -- CONSENSUS -- (AP, FWAA, TSN, WCFF, CBS, ESPN, Scout, SI, CFN)
Ryan Nassib, Syracuse (PFW)

Running back
Montee Ball, Wisconsin -- CONSENSUS -- (AFCA, AP, WCFF, ESPN, PFW)
Kenjon Barner, Oregon -- CONSENSUS -- (AFCA, FWAA, TSN, WCFF, ESPN, Scout, SI)
Le'Veon Bell, Michigan State (CFN)
Ka'Deem Carey, Arizona -- CONSENSUS -- (AP, TSN, WCFF, CBS, Scout, SI, CFN)
Johnathan Franklin, UCLA (FWAA, CBS)

Fullback
J. C. Copeland, LSU (PFW)

Wide receiver
Stedman Bailey, West Virginia (FWAA, CBS, CFN)
Marqise Lee, Southern California -- UNANIMOUS -- (AFCA, AP, FWAA, TSN, WCFF, CBS, ESPN, PFW, Scout, SI, CFN)
Sammy Watkins, Clemson (PFW)
Terrance Williams, Baylor -- UNANIMOUS -- (AFCA, AP, FWAA, TSN, WCFF, CBS, ESPN, Scout, SI)

Tight end
Tyler Eifert, Notre Dame (PFW, CFN)
Zach Ertz, Stanford -- UNANIMOUS -- (AFCA, AP, TSN, WCFF, CBS, ESPN, Scout, SI)

Offensive line
Jonathan Cooper, North Carolina  -- UNANIMOUS -- (AFCA, AP, FWAA, TSN, WCFF, CBS, ESPN, PFW, Scout, SI, CFN)
Eric Fisher, Central Michigan (PFW)
D. J. Fluker, Alabama (CBS, Scout)
Travis Frederick, Wisconsin (PFW)
Dalton Freeman, Clemson (AFCA)
Gabe Ikard, Oklahoma (CFN)
Luke Joeckel, Texas A&M -- UNANIMOUS -- (AFCA, AP, FWAA, TSN, WCFF, CBS, ESPN, PFW, Scout, SI, CFN)
Barrett Jones, Alabama -- CONSENSUS -- (AP, FWAA, TSN, WCFF, CBS, ESPN, Scout, SI)
Taylor Lewan, Michigan (AP, WCFF, ESPN, SI, CFN)
Jake Matthews, Texas A&M (FWAA)
Ricky Wagner, Wisconsin (CFN)
Chance Warmack, Alabama -- UNANIMOUS -- (AFCA, AP, FWAA, TSN, WCFF, CBS, ESPN, PFW, Scout, SI)
David Yankey, Stanford -- CONSENSUS -- (AFCA, TSN)

Defense

Defensive line
Jadeveon Clowney, South Carolina -- UNANIMOUS -- (AFCA, AP, FWAA, TSN, WCFF, CBS, ESPN, PFW, Scout, SI, CFN)
Sharrif Floyd, Florida (TSN)
Johnathan Hankins, Ohio State (Scout)
Chris Jones, Bowling Green (FWAA)
Bennie Logan, LSU (PFW)
Star Lotulelei, Utah (AP, WCFF, Scout)
Damontre Moore, Texas A&M -- CONSENSUS -- (AFCA, FWAA, WCFF, ESPN, CFN)
Will Sutton, Arizona State -- CONSENSUS -- (AFCA, AP, TSN, CBS, SI, CFN)
Stephon Tuitt, Notre Dame (CBS, ESPN, SI)
Björn Werner, Florida State -- UNANIMOUS -- (AFCA, AP, FWAA, TSN, WCFF, CBS, PFW, Scout)
Jesse Williams, Alabama (CFN)
Sylvester Williams, North Carolina (PFW)

Linebacker
Arthur Brown, Kansas State (FWAA)
Khaseem Greene, Rutgers (ESPN, CFN)
Jarvis Jones, Georgia -- UNANIMOUS -- (AFCA, AP, FWAA, TSN, WCFF, CBS, ESPN, PFW, Scout, SI, CFN)
Dion Jordan, Oregon  (PFW)
Michael Mauti, Penn State (ESPN)
Kevin Minter, LSU (SI)
C. J. Mosley, Alabama -- CONSENSUS -- (AFCA, AP, TSN, WCFF, CBS, Scout, SI)
Manti Te'o, Notre Dame -- UNANIMOUS -- (AFCA, AP, FWAA, TSN, WCFF, CBS, ESPN, PFW, Scout, SI, CFN)

Defensive back
Johnthan Banks, Mississippi State (FWAA, WCFF, Scout)
Matt Elam, Florida (AP, TSN, CBS, Scout, SI, CFN)
Tony Jefferson, Oklahoma (PFW)
Dee Milliner, Alabama -- UNANIMOUS -- (AFCA, AP, FWAA, TSN, WCFF, CBS, ESPN, PFW, Scout, CFN)
Jordan Poyer, Oregon State -- CONSENSUS -- (AFCA, AP, TSN, WCFF, CBS, SI)
Eric Reid, LSU -- CONSENSUS -- (AFCA, FWAA, ESPN, Scout)
Bradley Roby, Ohio State (ESPN)
Logan Ryan, Rutgers (PFW)
Phillip Thomas, Fresno State -- UNANIMOUS -- (AFCA, AP, FWAA, TSN, WCFF, CBS, ESPN, SI, CFN)
Kenny Vaccaro, Texas (PFW)
Jason Verrett, TCU (SI, CFN)

Special teams

Kicker
Dustin Hopkins, Florida State (WCFF, CBS, Scout, ESPN, PFW)
Cairo Santos, Tulane -- CONSENSUS -- (AP, FWAA, SI, CFN)
Quinn Sharp, Oklahoma State (AFCA)
Caleb Sturgis, Florida (TSN)

Punter
Ryan Allen, Louisiana Tech -- UNANIMOUS -- (AFCA, AP, FWAA, TSN, WCFF, CBS, ESPN, PFW, SI, CFN)
Kyle Christy, Florida (Scout)

All-purpose / return specialist
Dri Archer, Kent State  -- CONSENSUS -- (FWAA, TSN, WCFF, ESPN, Scout)
Tavon Austin, West Virginia  (AFCA, AP, CBS, PFW, Scout, SI)
Reggie Dunn, Utah  (CBS, ESPN)
Duke Johnson, Miami  (CFN)
Venric Mark, Northwestern  (FWAA, TSN, CBS)
Quincy McDuffie, UCF  (SI)
Tramaine Thompson, Kansas State  (CFN)

See also
 2012 All-Big 12 Conference football team
 2012 All-Big Ten Conference football team
 2012 All-Pac-12 Conference football team
 2012 All-SEC football team

Notes

References
Consensus/unanimous announcement
2012 Associated Press All-American team
2012 AFCA All-America team
2012 FWAA All-America team
2012 Sporting News' All-American team
2012 CBS All-America team
2012 ESPN All-America team
2012 Scout.com All-America team
Walter Camp All-America team
2012 Sports Illustrated All-American team
2012 Pro Football Weekly All-America team
2012 College Football News All-America Team

All-America Team
College Football All-America Teams